The Sofia Metro (also colloquially called ) is the rapid transit network servicing the Bulgarian capital city Sofia. It began operation on 28 January 1998. The Metro links the densely populated districts of Lyulin – Mladost (M1 line – Red) and Nadezhda – Lozenets (M2 line – Blue), and serves the Sofia Airport.

History
Planned since the 1960s, construction of the metro has started in 80s with demolishing of significant number of buildings. At the beginning of 90s the construction has stopped because of lack of funds.  Another factor was the depth at which the construction works had to be carried out: being one of the oldest cities in Europe, Sofia contains many historical layers underneath its central areas. Evidence of antiquity can be clearly seen at the Serdika Station which exhibits a wealth of unearthed Thracian and Roman ruins and modern architecture. During the construction of the enormous complex of the National Palace of Culture two stations forming part of the then future M2 line and their connecting tunnels were built.

The construction of the system began from the route that sees the highest volumes of passenger traffic, that can easily reach up to 38,000 at rush hour.

Lines
Due to an increased population, there are a large number of passengers heading toward the city center during weekday mornings, and away from the city centre in the weekday evenings. The necessity of efficient public transport in the direction of the largest passenger flows, transport, and Sofia's environmental problems precipitated the start of the construction of the Sofia Metro.

M1 line (Red)

The completion of the first three stations was projected for the autumn of 2007, however as a result of various delays it was the second section from the first line (Vasil Levski stadium – Mladost 1) that first entered into service on 8 May 2009, operating for a brief period of time separately from the north-west portion of the line. The remaining section between Serdika and Vasil Levski stadium station finally entered into service on 7 September 2009 establishing an uninterrupted link between Obelya and Mladost 1 stations.

The construction of the stretch from Mladost I to Business Park Sofia station (three underground stations) began on 25 April 2013, and was completed on 8 May 2015. It cost BGN 85,767,683 (EUR 43,852,320), VAT exclusive, and serves the majority of the second most densely populated area in Sofia. Part of the sections "Sofia Airport" - "Iskarsko Shose" and, Ovcha kupel" -, Krasno selo" are not underground.

M2 and M4 lines (Blue/Yellow)

The second and fourth lines of the Sofia Metro links the districts of Obelya, Nadezhda, the city centre and Lozenets to the south of the city. Half of the construction cost was covered by the European Union, with the remaining part funded by the state and city budgets. Construction of the  section between Nadezhda interchange and Lozenets district via Central railway station and the National Palace of Culture started on 14 December 2008. Work on the section between Obelya residential District and Nadezhda started in February 2010. Both sections of the line entered into service on 31 August 2012.

NDK and European Union stations and their connecting tunnels were partly completed during the construction of the National Palace of Culture and the redevelopment of the surrounding area in the late 1970s and early 1980s.

The construction of Mladost 3 and Inter Expo Center – Tsarigradsko shose stations began on 15 February 2009 and was completed on 25 April 2012. The further extension to Sofia Airport comprising two underground and two overground stations and a length of  began in 2013, and was completed on 2 April 2015 at the cost of BGN 136,757,630 (EUR 69,923,066), VAT exclusive. This extension was briefly operated as a branch of M1 line, but was soon transferred to M2 line, moving that line's terminus from Obelya to Sofia Airport.

The construction took 2 years.

Provisions have been made for the construction of future branch to Iliyantsi, starting from the existing junction located between Knyaginya Maria Luiza and Han Kubrat stations.

Splitting the line to M2 and M4 
On 26 August 2020, the second line was split into two portions: the M2 line, running from Vitosha station to Obelya station and the M4 line, running from Obelya to Sofia Airport. The trains continue to run the length of both lines but on maps and other metro signage the M4 line is gradually being introduced. The split is in preparation to the future construction of the Moderno predgradie station, which is supposed to physically separate the lines and will allow them to have independent timetables.

M2 line

M4 line

M5 Iliyantsi branch (planned)

M5 Studentski grad branch (planned) 
The Studentski grad branch is a recently planned branch, starting from Cherni vrah Blvd, passing through Vitosha quarter and entering Studentski grad and near Zimen dvorets complex. Exact route is not yet selected and construction horizon – not set.

M3 line (Green)

The first 8 stations of the line entered service on 26 August 2020, and the other 4 on 24 April 2021.

There will be 8 aboveground and 11 underground stations. The project design contract was awarded to the Czech company Metroprojekt Praha a.s.

In March 2014, a tender for construction of the central section of the line was announced. With the announcement of the tender, it became clear that the initial plans for 19 stations had been partly amended and 2 of the stations, one at Doyran boulevard and another at Shipka street, will be not be built. The tunnel of the central section shall be excavated by a tunnel boring machine, while the construction of stations shall be awarded to other companies. The construction of the section shall be completed within 45 months. In January 2015, a tender for 20 trains that shall serve the central section of the line was announced. Driverless train operation, with Grade of Automation 3 (GoA 3), and platform screen doors will ensure the safety of the passengers. Unlike Lines 1 and 2, where the trains collect power through a third rail, Line 3 trains will be equipped with pantographs. CAF and Siemens applied bids in the tender for the trains, with Siemens winning it.

In early 2016, construction began on the third metro line of the Sofia Metro using the technology for classic underground metro with high-power support. Under construction are all metro stations in the central section, plus a few in the west and east of downtown Sofia. The third line of the Sofia Metro will have a total of 23 metro stations, as follows: 16 metro stations for the Main Line and 7 metro stations for the Eastern branch.

Currently, 12 stations of the main line are in operation and 3 are under construction, with their estimated completion being in 2025.

Main Line (M3)

M6 branch to Slatina

Fares and ticketing
The price of a single ticket is 1.60 lev, equivalent to ~0.82 euro. It can be issued either by a cashier, or by a vending machine. When obtained, the single ticket must be validated within 30 minutes at a validator. Pre-paid RFID (MIFARE Classic) card also could be bought (at a price of 2 levs) with minimum 10 pre-paid rides (at a price of 12 levs for 10 pre-paid rides). Daily and monthly cards are also available.

Starting 1 November 2021 you can pay your fare using a contactless debit or credit card at every station of the network. You will be able to also pay using a mobile wallet (Apple Pay, Google Pay, Garmin Pay etc.). The fare will be the same price as a paper ticket (1.60 lev or ~0.82 euro) and the amount you pay per day will max out at 4 levs (or about 2 euro) which is 3 trips (the first and second trips will cost the full 1.60 levs, 3rd will cost 0.80 levs and every trip after will be de facto free). The 4 levs max resets every day at 12 AM local time.

Rolling stock
The system uses 4 types of rolling stock.

The older train sets, type 81-717/714, were manufactured by Metrowagonmash in Mytishchi, Moscow Oblast, Russia and consists of 48 carriages in total. They were delivered in 1990 – some 8 years prior to the opening of the first section of the system. In 2020 the first train sets of this type were refurbished and went into service.

The second generation of rolling stock, type 81-740/741 "Rusich", were also manufactured by Metrowagonmash and delivered between 2005 and 2013, consisting of 120 carriages in total.

The third generation of rolling stock, Siemens Inspiro 30 three-car sets were delivered between 2016 and 2021 and exclusively serve the M3 line.

Ridership

Network Map

See also

 Trams in Sofia
 Trolleybuses in Sofia
 Public buses in Sofia
 Sofia Public Transport
 List of metro systems

References

External links

 Sofia Metro – Official Web Site
 MetroSofia.com 
 Interactive Sofia Metro Map
 Sofia metro @ urbanrail.net
 Metrovagonmash OAO – Information about the rolling stock
 Metro @ public-transport.net
 Unofficial Sofia tube map inspired by London's one, designed for foreign visitors
 Sofia Metro – quick info and maps
 Sofia Metro Map

 
Underground rapid transit in Bulgaria
Rapid transit in Bulgaria
Railway lines opened in 1998
1998 establishments in Bulgaria